Yukiyagawa Dam  is a gravity dam located in Iwate Prefecture in Japan. The dam is used for flood control and irrigation. The catchment area of the dam is 70.9 km2. The dam impounds about 41  ha of land when full and can store 2662 thousand cubic meters of water. The construction of the dam was started on 1967 and completed in 1977.

See also
List of dams in Japan

References

Dams in Iwate Prefecture